Léo Edmond Marion,  (March 22, 1899 – July 16, 1979) was a Canadian organic chemist and academic administrator.

He was Vice-President of the National Research Council of Canada. From 1964 until 1965 he was President of the Royal Society of Canada. From 1965 until 1969, he was Dean of Faculty of Pure and Applied Science at the University of Ottawa.

Honours
 In 1963 he was awarded an Honorary Doctor of Science from the University of British Columbia.
 In 1965 he was awarded an Honorary Doctor of Science from Carleton University.
 In 1967 he was made a Companion of the Order of Canada.
 In 1968 he was awarded an Honorary Doctor of Laws from the University of Saskatchewan.

References

External links
 

1899 births
1979 deaths
Canadian chemists
Canadian university and college faculty deans
Companions of the Order of Canada
Fellows of the Royal Society
Fellows of the Royal Society of Canada
Scientists from Ontario
20th-century Canadian scientists
Academic staff of the University of Ottawa
Organic chemists
Canadian Members of the Order of the British Empire